The Best Horror of the Year: Volume Two is a horror fiction anthology edited by Ellen Datlow that was published on March 10, 2010. It is the second in The Best Horror of the Year series.

Contents
The book includes 17 stories, all but one first published in 2009 (one included story, by Micaela Morrissette, was first published in the November/December 2008 issue of Weird Tales). The book also includes a summation by Datlow, and a list of honorable mentions for the year. The stories are as follows:

Suzy McKee Charnas: "Lowland Sea"
Steve Eller: "The End of Everything"
Reggie Oliver: "Mrs. Midnight"
Gemma Files & Stephen J. Barringer: "each thing i show you is a piece of my death"
Glen Hirshberg: "The Nimble Men"
Michael Marshall Smith: "What Happens When You Wake Up in the Night"
Micaela Morrissette: "Wendigo"
Norman Prentiss: "In the Porches of My Ears"
Stephen Graham Jones: "Lonegan's Luck"
Dale Bailey & Nathan Ballingrud: "The Crevasse"
Steve Duffy: "The Lion's Den"
Edward Morris: "Lotophagi"
Kaaron Warren: "The Gaze Dogs of Nine Waterfall"
Carole Johnstone: "Dead Loss"
Laird Barron: "Strappado"
Nina Allan: "The Lammas Worm"
John Langan: "Technicolor"

External links
 
Book review at Oddly Weird Fiction

2010 anthologies
Horror anthologies
Night Shade Books books